Lund is a common surname, principally of Danish, Swedish, Norwegian and English origin. As a common noun lund means grove in all North Germanic languages. Lund can be English and can be Scandinavian surname. Also Scandinavian and English surnames can have a particle lund. Lund may refer to:

A–G
Alan Lund, (1925–1992), Canadian dancer and choreographer
Alma Lund (1854–1932), Finnish soprano opera singer
Anders Lund (born 1985), Danish professional road bicycle racer 
Andreas Heldal-Lund (born 1964), Norwegian anti-Scientology activist
Andreas Lund (born 1975), Norwegian footballer
Annfinn Lund  (1926–2001), Norwegian civil servant and politician for the Labour Party
Ann Lund, Australian award winning journalist
Anthon H. Lund, (1844–1921),  Danish-American LDS church leader
Anthony C. Lund, (1871–1935), American musical director 
Arild Lund (born 1940), Norwegian politician for the Conservative Party  
Art Lund, (1915—1990), American baritone singer
Bill Lund (1924–2008), American football halfback
Bjørn Arve Lund (born 1981), Norwegian football player 
Carl Wesenberg-Lund (1867–1955), Danish zoologist and freshwater ecologist
Carsten Lund (born 1963), American theoretical computer scientist 
Charles A. Lund (1878-1959), American lawyer and politician
Christine Lund (born 1944), Swedish-born American news anchor 
Christiana Lund, American singer 
Corb Lund, Canadian country singer-songwriter
Daryl B. Lund (born 1941), American food scientist and engineer 
David Lund (born 1925), American abstract expressionist painter 
Deanna Lund (1937–2018), American film and television actress 
Don Lund (1923–2013), American baseball outfielder 
Doug Lund, American news co-anchor 
Eddie Lund (1909-1973), Canadian pianist 
Edward Victor Lund, English cricketer 
Eilert Stang Lund (born 1939), Norwegian judge 
Eilert Falch-Lund (1875–1960), Norwegian sailor in the 1908 Summer Olympics
Engel Lund (1900–1996), Danish-Icelandic soprano 
Erik Lund (footballer) (born 1988), Swedish professional footballer 
Erik Lund (rugby union) (born 1979), Norwegian rugby union footballer 
Eva Lund (1907-1997), Norwegian-American author
Eva Lund (born 1971), Swedish curler 
Flemming Lund (born 1952), Danish professional soccer player 
Frederick Lund (early 1900s), proprietor of the Blue Anchor Line shipping company
Frederik Macody Lund (1863–1943), Norwegian historian 
Fredrik Stang Lund  (1859–1922), Norwegian politician for the Liberal Party  
Garry Lund football (soccer), New Zealand soccer player 
Gary J. Lund (born 1964), English footballer 
Gerald N. Lund (born 1939), American LDS church leader 
Gordon Lund (born 1941), American former shortstop  
Gun Lund (born 1943), Swedish choreographer and dancer 
Gunnar Lund (born 1947), Swedish diplomat and politician  
Gustav Henrik Andreas Budde-Lund (1846–1911), Danish zoologist

H–P
Hans Lund (ca. 1949–2009), American professional poker player 
Helge Lund (born 1962), Norwegian Chief Executive Officer for the Statoil group
Henrik Lund (disambiguation), multiple people
Hilda Lund (1840–1911), Swedish ballerina  
Ivan Lund (1929–1992), Australian fencer
Jenny Lund (born 1961), Australian long-distance runner
JoAnna Lund (1944–2006),  American author 
Johan Ludwig Lund (1777–1867), Danish painter 
Johan Michael Lund (1753–1824), Norwegian lawyer
John Lund (actor) (1911–1992),  American film actor of Norwegian ancestry 
John Lund (racing driver), British Formula One Stock Car driver 
John Walter Guerrier Lund (1912–2015), English phycologist 
John Theodor Lund (1842–1913), Norwegian politician for the Liberal Party  
Jon A. Lund (born 1928), American attorney  
Jordan Lund (born 1957), American stage, film and television character actor
Joyce M. Lund (1909–2009), American journalist and politician
Julie V. Lund (born c1959) American juvenile court judge in Utah 
Julie Lund (born 1979), Danish actress, radio host and television presenter
Jules Lund (born 1979), Australian television presenter  
Karl Lund  (1888–1942), Finnish gymnast in the 1912 Summer Olympics
Karen Lund (born 1962), Archdeacon of Manchester
Karsten Lund (born 1943), Danish former football player
Ketil Lund (born 1939), Norwegian judge 
Kistat Lund (1944–2017), Greenlandic artist
Klas Lund (born 1968), Swedish member of the neonazi group Nordic Resistance Movement
Kristin Skogen Lund (born 1966), Norwegian businessperson 
Lars Erik Lund (born 1974), Norwegian professional ice hockey player
Larry Lund (born 1940), Canadian professional ice hockey player 
Leif Lund  (1942–2004), Norwegian politician for the Labour Party 
Linnéa Handberg Lund, Danish eurodance musician 
Lucille Lund  (1913–2002), American film actress 
Magnus Lund (born 1983), English rugby union footballer of Norwegian origin; brother of Norwegian rugby player Erik 
Mark Lund (born 1965), American writer, publisher, and television analyst 
Maria Lund, British slalom canoer 
Marie Lund, Swedish ski-orienteering competitor 
Masha Lund (1981), Danish/Russian model 
Matthew Lund (born 1990), Northern Irish footballer
Matti Lund Nielsen (1988), Danish football player
Michael Lund (born 1965), Australian freelance journalist 
Mickey Lund (born 1972), Danish cricketer 
Mitchell Lund (born 1996), English footballer  
Morten Lund (investor) (born 1972), venture capitalist
Morten Lund (musician) (born 1972), Danish jazz drummer
Morten Lund (politician) (born 1945), Norwegian politician
Niels Moeller Lund (1863–1916), Danish artist 
Oscar A. C. Lund  (1885–1963), Swedish silent film actor, screenwriter, and director
Pentti Lund (born 1925), Finnish-born Canadian professional ice hockey right winger 
Per Berg Lund  (1878–1954), Norwegian Minister of Finance 
Pete Lund, American politician
Peter Wilhelm Lund (1801–1880), Danish zoologist and paleontologist 
Pug Lund (1913–1994), American football player

R–Z
Regina Lund (born 1967), Swedish actress and singer 
Richard Lund (1885–1960), Swedish film and theatre actor 
Richard T. Lund, former Secretary General of the Scout Movement
Rosa Lund (born 1986), Danish politician
Rune Lund (born 1976), Danish politician
Sara Lund (born 1973), American drummer
Sigurd Lund Hamran (1902–1977), Norwegian politician for the Labour Party 
Sigrid Helliesen Lund (1892–1987), Norwegian peace activist 
Sonja Lund (born 1942), Swedish actress and dancer
Søren Robert Lund (born 1962), Danish architect 
Steve Lund (born 1989), Canadian actor 
Svend Lund (1949), Danish handball player in the 1972 Summer Olympics  
Tamara Lund (1941–2005), Finnish singer and actress
Thomas Lund (dancer) (born 1974), with the Royal Danish Ballet
Thomas Lund (born 1968), Danish badminton player 
Thor Lund (1921–1999), Norwegian politician for the Labour Party 
Thorleif Lund  (1880–1956), Norwegian stage and film actor of the silent film era 
Thure Erik Lund (born 1959), Norwegian author and cabinet maker
Tiny Lund (1929–1975), American NASCAR driver
Tom Lund (handballer) (born 1944), Danish handball player  in the 1972 Summer Olympics
Tom Lund (born 1950), Norwegian football coach and striker 
Tor Lund (1888–1972), Norwegian gymnast in the 1912 Summer Olympics
Troels Frederik Lund (1840–1921), Danish historian 
Ty Lund (born 1938), Canadian politician
Zach Lund (born 1979), American skeleton racer 
Zoë Tamerlis Lund (1962–1999), American musician

Fictional characters
Erik Lund, the character played by Peter Gantzler in Min søsters børn (My Sister's Children), a Danish film from 2001
Ilsa Lund, the character played by Ingrid Bergman in Casablanca (1942)
Sarah Lund, the character played by Sofie Gråbøl in The Killing (Danish TV series) (2007–2012)

Danish-language surnames
Norwegian-language surnames
Swedish-language surnames